Đông Thái is a rural commune of An Biên District, Kiên Giang Province, Vietnam.

References

Populated places in Kiên Giang province